Indian Trail School may refer to:

 Indian Trail Elementary School, Downers Grove, Illinois
 Indian Trail Junior High School, Addison, Illinois
 Indian Trail Elementary School, North Shore School District 112, Highland Park, Illinois
 Indian Trails Middle School, Romeoville, Illinois
 Indian Trail Elementary School, LaPorte, Indiana
 Indian Trail Middle School, Olathe School District, Olathe, Kansas
 Indian Trail Elementary School, a public school in Louisville, Kentucky
 Indian Trail Elementary School, Fort Osage R-1 School District, Independence, Missouri
 Indian Trail Elementary School, Indian Trail, North Carolina
 Indian Trail Elementary School, Stow-Munroe Falls City School District, Stow, Ohio
 Indian Trail Intermediate School, Johnson City, Tennessee
 Indian Trail Elementary School, Spokane Public Schools, Spokane, Washington
 Indian Trail High School and Academy, Kenosha, Wisconsin

See also
 Indian Trail (disambiguation)
 Indian Trails Middle School (disambiguation)